Dmytro Levytsky (1877–1942) was a lawyer and major political figure in western Ukraine between the two world wars. Between 1925 and 1935 he headed the Ukrainian National Democratic Alliance, the largest Ukrainian political party in western Ukraine, and served as the chief of the Ukrainian delegation within the Polish parliament.

Biography
Dmytro Levytsky was born in the Lviv region, then part of Austria-Hungary, in 1877. He completed law school at the University of Vienna and during World War I served as an officer in the army of Austria-Hungary. Captured by the Russians in 1915, he spent the remainder of the war in Tashkent. Returning to Ukraine as the Russian Empire fell apart, Levytsky helped to organize the unification of the West Ukrainian National Republic with the Ukrainian National Republic. After western Ukraine was conquered by Poland in 1919, Levytsky was involved in organizing Ukrainians in Vienna. In 1923 he became editor of western Ukrainians' largest newspaper, and two years later he became head of the newly formed Ukrainian National Democratic Alliance, the largest political party representing Ukrainians within the Polish state. Between 1928 and 1935 he was a member of the Polish parliament and was head of the Ukrainian delegation. He resigned his leadership of the party when it chose to work together with  the Polish government. When western Ukraine was annexed by the Soviets, Levytsky was arrested, deported to Moscow and never heard from again.

He died in exile in Bukhara (1942).

References

1877 births
1942 deaths
People from Lviv Oblast
People from the Kingdom of Galicia and Lodomeria
Ukrainian Austro-Hungarians
Ukrainian National Democratic Alliance politicians
Members of the Sejm of the Second Polish Republic (1928–1930)
Members of the Sejm of the Second Polish Republic (1930–1935)
Ambassadors of Ukraine to Denmark
World War I prisoners of war held by Russia
Austro-Hungarian prisoners of war in World War I
Ukrainian prisoners of war